Salveson is a surname. Notable people with the surname include:

 Jack Salveson (1914–1974), American baseball player
 Paul Salveson (born 20th century), English politician, activist and author

See also
 Salvesen